Senchoa Gaon is a census town in Jorhat district in the Indian state of Assam.

Demographics
 India census, Senchoa Gaon had a population of 7366. Males constitute 54% of the population and females 46%. Senchoa Gaon has an average literacy rate of 82%, higher than the national average of 59.5%: male literacy is 82%, and female literacy is 81%. In Senchoa Gaon, 10% of the population is under 6 years of age.

References

Cities and towns in Jorhat district
Jorhat